Karen P. Thomas (born 1957), composer and conductor, is the Artistic Director and Conductor of Seattle Pro Musica and Director of Music at University Unitarian Church. With Seattle Pro Musica she has produced six CD recordings, and has received the Margaret Hillis Award for Choral Excellence and the ASCAP-Chorus America Award for Adventuresome Programming of Contemporary Music. Ms. Thomas has guest conducted at international festivals in Europe and North America, and has served on the boards of the American Choral Director's Association for Washington State, the Conductor's Guild, the League-ISCM and the International Alliance for Women in Music. Ms. Thomas is a recipient of grants and awards from the National Endowment for the Arts, American Academy and Institute of Arts and Letters, and ASCAP, among others. Her compositions have been awarded prizes in various competitions, and her commissions include works for the Grand Jubilee 2000 in Rome, the American Guild of Organists, and the Goodwill Arts Festival. Her compositions are regularly performed internationally, by groups such as The Hilliard Ensemble, and have been praised as "superb work of the utmost sensitivity and beauty." Her conducting has received critical praise for its "integrity and high purpose...delivered with taste and impeccable musicianship."

Awards and Fellowships 
 Margaret Hillis Award for Choral Excellence
 Seattle Arts Commission Seattle Artists Award
 Distinguished Alumna Award - Cornish College of the Arts
 His Majestie's Clerkes Choral Composition Competition
 ASCAP-Chorus America Award for Adventurous Programming of Contemporary Music
 Artist Trust GAP Grant
 Oregon Bach Festival Composition Fellow
 Chorus of Westerly Conducting Fellow
 Delius Composition Contest First Place
 National Association of College Wind and Percussion Instructors Composition Contest
 Dorland Mountain Arts Colony Composition Fellow
 Washington State Arts Commission Artist Fellowship Award
 Melodious Accord Composition Contest
 King County Arts Commission Individual Artist Grant
 National Endowment for the Arts Challenge III Grant (Goodwill Arts Festival co-recipient)
 New Langton Arts (co-recipient)
 Artist Trust Fellowship
 Northwest Chamber Orchestra Composers Forum Award
 American Academy and Institute of Arts and Letters Charles E. Ives Scholar
 Brechemin Foundation Scholar
 International League of Women Composers' Third Annual Search for New Music

Selected Conducting Performances 
 Bergen International Festival
 Goodwill Arts Festival
 World Festival of Women's Singing
 Festival Vancouver
 International Conference on Women in Music

Compositions Performed By
 Hilliard Ensemble
 International Festival Donne in Musica;  Italy
 Bergen International Festival; Norway
 Grand Jubilee for the Year 2000; Rome
 World Festival of Women's Singing
 International Congress on Women in Music; London, England and Bilbao,  Spain
 Festival Vancouver;  Canada

Selected Compositions

Instrumental 
 When night came... (for the women of Bosnia) clarinet & chamber ensemble or orchestra; or clarinet and piano
 Roundup; saxophone quartet
 Clarion Dances; brass ensemble
 There must be a Lone Ranger! soprano or mezzo, narrator, chamber ensemble
 Rhapsodic Ignition, guitar

Choral 
Lux Lucis
Over the City (for Hiroshima)
Three Medieval Lyrics
Four Lewis Carroll Songs

Vocal 
 Cowboy Songs

Opera 
 Coyote's Tail; one-act opera for children

Dance 
 Boxiana:  The Women's Flyweight Championship of the World

References

External links
 Karen P. Thomas - Official Website
 Biography at Seattle Pro Musica
 Biography at University Unitarian Church

American women classical composers
American classical composers
Women conductors (music)
Living people
Cornish College of the Arts alumni
1957 births
21st-century American conductors (music)
21st-century American women musicians